HD 240210 is a star in the northern constellation of Cassiopeia. It has an orange hue but is too faint to be viewed with the naked eye, having an apparent visual magnitude of 8.33. Parallax measurements provide an estimate of its distance from the Sun as approximately 1,230 light years. It is drifting further away with a radial velocity of +8.6 km/s.

This is an aging giant star with a class of K3, which has exhausted the supply of hydrogen at its core and expanded to 25 times the radius of the Sun. It is around three billion years old with 1.3 times the Sun's mass. The star is radiating 152 times the luminosity of the Sun from its enlarged photosphere at an effective temperature of 4,019 K. It is spinning slowly, with each rotation taking at least .

On June 10, 2009 a planet orbiting the star was discovered by Niedzielski et al. This exoplanet is a 6.9 or greater Jupiter mass planet. Evidence for additional planetary companions has been found.

See also 
 BD+14°4559
 BD+20°2457
 List of extrasolar planets
 John Flamsteed

References 

K-type giants
Planetary systems with one confirmed planet
Cassiopeia (constellation)
Durchmusterung objects
Cassiopeiae, 10
240210